
The East Fork Millicoma River is a tributary, about  long, of the Millicoma River in the U.S. state of Oregon. Rising in eastern Coos County, it flows generally west to the community of Allegany, where it joins the West Fork Millicoma River to form the Millicoma.

About  further downstream, Little Matson Creek enters from the right, and a mile or so later Fox Creek enters from the left. Glenn Creek and one of its tributaries, Silver Creek, cascade over Golden and Silver falls in the Golden and Silver Falls State Natural Area. The East Fork Millicoma River then passes a stream gauge managed by the Coos Watershed Association.

Rodine Creek enters from the left about  later. Just below the confluence with Rodine Creek, Nesika County Park is on the left, and Hodges Creek enters from the left. Less than a mile from Allegany, Marlow Creek enters from the right and then Nowlit Creek, also from the right, before the East Fork meets the West Fork to form the Millicoma. East Fork Millicoma Road runs parallel to the river for much of its course.

The river supports coastal cutthroat trout and a run of winter steelhead.

See also
List of rivers of Oregon

References

Works cited
McArthur, Lewis A., and McArthur, Lewis L. (2003) [1928]. Oregon Geographic Names, 7th ed. Portland: Oregon Historical Society Press. .
Sheehan, Madelynne Diness (2005). Fishing in Oregon: The Complete Oregon Fishing Guide, 10th ed. Scappoose, Oregon: Flying Pencil Publications. .

External links
Coos Watershed Association

Rivers of Coos County, Oregon
Rivers of Oregon